The Great Britain men's national ice hockey team (also known as Team GB) is the national ice hockey team that represents the United Kingdom. A founding member of the International Ice Hockey Federation (IIHF) in 1908, the team is controlled by Ice Hockey UK. Great Britain is currently ranked 18th in the world by the IIHF as of March 2022 according to the IIHF World Ranking.

History
The team was a force on the international scene in the early 20th century, winning the first ever IIHF European Championship in 1910, finishing as bronze medalists at the 1924 Winter Olympics in Chamonix, France, and becoming Olympic champions in 1936 in Garmisch-Partenkirchen, Germany. The gold medal-winning Olympic team was composed primarily of dual-national British Canadians, many of whom having learned and played the game in Canada.

However, since then the national team has made little impact on the sport. Until they surprisingly qualified for the 2019 installment of the tournament, their last appearance in the top-level World Championship came in 1994. Great Britain last qualified for the Olympics in 1948.

The current head coach of the team is Peter Russell, who is also the head coach for the Augsburger Panther of the DEL.

Tournament record

Olympic Games

World Championships

European Championships

Standalone tournaments

European Championship results from combined events

Current roster
Roster for the 2022 IIHF World Championship.

Head coach: Peter Russell

Uniform evolution

See also
England men's national ice hockey team
Great Britain men's national junior ice hockey team
Great Britain men's national under-18 ice hockey team
Great Britain women's national ice hockey team
Scotland national ice hockey team

References

External links

IIHF profile
National Teams of Ice Hockey

 
National
National ice hockey teams in Europe